Thyrfing is the eponymous and first album by the Swedish viking metal band Thyrfing. It was released in 1998.

Track listing
 "Raven Eyes" - 03:37
 "Vargavinter" - 02:59
 "Set Sail to Plunder" - 04:22
 "Ur Askan Ett Rike" - 03:04
 "Celebration of Our Victory" - 04:43
 "A Burning Arrow" - 02:50
 "En Döende Mans Förbannelse" - 03:34
 "Hednaland" - 03:34
 "Wotan's Fire" - 04:32
 "Going Berserk" - 05:09

References

1998 albums
Thyrfing albums
Hammerheart Records albums